Hunan Normal University station, commonly abbreviated as Hunan Shida station, is a subway station in Changsha, Hunan, China, operated by the Changsha subway operator Changsha Metro.

Station layout
The station has one island platform.

History
The station opened on 26 May 2019.

Surrounding area
 Hunan Normal University

References

Railway stations in Hunan
Railway stations in China opened in 2019
Railway stations in China at university and college campuses